Glomerular hyperfiltration is a situation where the filtration elements in the kidneys called glomeruli produce excessive amounts of pro-urine. It can be part of a number of medical conditions particularly diabetic nephropathy (kidney damage associated with diabetes).

Various medical research studies have used different criteria for classifying glomerular hyperfiltration.

References

Nephrology